Kadri Voorand (born 18 November 1986, in Haljala) is an Estonian singer and composer.

She has been the leader or a member of several musical groups, including Kadri Voorand Quartet and Estonian Voices.

In 2021 she participated in "Eesti Laul 2021" with the song "Energy". The song achieved 6th place.

Works
 composition "Giving Myself to the Sea"
 song "Ära mind lahti lase"

Albums
 2009: "Tunde kaja"
 2012: "Kosmoloogiline etüüd" (Kadri Voorand Trio)
 2016: "Armupurjus" (Kadri Voorand Quartet)

References

External links
 

Living people
1986 births
Estonian pop singers
21st-century Estonian women singers
Estonian composers
Estonian Academy of Music and Theatre alumni
People from Haljala Parish